Rawang  is a town and a mukim in Gombak District, Selangor, Malaysia, about 23 km northwest of city centre Kuala Lumpur.

History
Rawang was founded in the early-19th century and was one of Kuala Lumpur earliest satellite towns. During the initial tin mining growth of Kuala Lumpur, many tin mines were explored and opened north of Kuala Lumpur, starting initially at the Ulu Kelang area and gradually moving northwards past Selayang and towards Rawang.

The earliest estimates of Rawang's founding date back to 1825. It was the second area in Selangor to be explored for tin mining. The tin mining industry in Rawang developed concurrently at around the same time as the larger tin mines Perak.

During the Selangor Civil War of the 1860s and 1870s, Yap Ah Loy's gangs who were aligned with Tengku Kudin repelled Syed Mashor's troops away from Kuala Lumpur and pushed them further north. During the Battle of Rawang in 1871, Syed Mashor's followers and Chinese gangs loyal to him (led by Chong Chong) ended up being pushed up towards Serendah and Kuala Kubu Bharu, with Yap Ah Loy's men (led by Chung Piang) holding their ground at Rawang. Thus, Rawang became an unofficial boundary of Tengku Kudin's dominance at the northern Klang Valley during the war.

In 1894, the first electric generator in British Malaya was installed in Rawang to support the mining industry, making Rawang the first location to be electrified in Malaysia. Numerous electrified tin mines were operated by Loke Yew and K. Thamboosamy Pillay, who both contributed significantly to the growth of Rawang. With Rawang being the first town in Malaya to utilize electricity for tin mining, it was also the first town to have electric street lights, and the Rawang Railway Station was the first railway station in Malaya that had an electricity supply to power the lamps and fans.

When World War II struck, Rawang fell to the Japanese invasion, and the tin mining sector rapidly deteriorated. After the war, the Rawang New Village (one such is now known as Kampung Sungai Terentang) was established by the British in 1951 during the Emergency. By this time, the Chinese population of Rawang also had a sizable percentage of Cantonese in addition to the Hakkas and Hokkiens.

The tin mining industry in Rawang picked up again in the 1950s. Rubber estates were also established around Rawang during this time. In 1953, the first cement factory in Malaya, Rawang Works, was launched by the Associated Pan Malayan Cement company (now Lafarge Malaysia Berhad) who took over much of the land vacated from the tin mining industry which had moved westwards to Batang Berjuntai. It also made Rawang one of the earliest towns in Malaysia to simultaneously produce agricultural, natural resource, and cement output. The Lafarge Cement factory was since bought over by YTL Cement but subsequently closed down in 2020 due to the high cost of production but it still has high value due to the land-bank option for future development  

Tin and rubber were major economic outputs of Rawang until the late-1970s, after which oil palm plantations started being established by private companies. Throughout the late-1980s until the 1990s, Rawang's economic output continued to diversify and many light industrial areas opened up during Malaysia's industrialization drive under the Fifth Malaysia Plan (RMK-5). Industrial zones that were set up at Sungai Dua and Rawang Perdana during this period generated jobs which resulted in further population growth and the increase in foreign workers residing in Rawang. The influx of foreign workers has transformed the landscape and composition of the industrial estates and townships.

In 1974, following Kuala Lumpur's separation from Selangor, a re-delineation exercise for that year's general election saw Rawang transferred from Hulu Selangor to Gombak (i.e. Selayang constituency). At the same time, Rawang township (mukim) was transferred to newly-created Gombak District and acted as the administrative center of the district. While northern part of Rawang including Bukit Beruntung, Bukit Sentosa, Serendah and Sungai Choh remained in Hulu Selangor District until now.

Rawang was the capital of Gombak until 1997 when it moved to Batu Caves, and is now a major administrative center for the district of Selayang. Rawang has undergone tremendous growth since the PLUS North-South Highway was opened in the mid-1990s. The population of Rawang stands at 120,447 according to the GeoNames geographical database. The Selayang Municipal Council building is situated at the new Rawang town center that was established in the early-2000s slightly north of the old Rawang town.

The District Magistrate's subordinate Court and the District Police Headquarters have moved away to Selayang from Rawang in the 1990s, while the town library and government-run public clinic were decommissioned. With this, the town now lacks playing fields and parks to support all-around growth as was before. The large land area in which the magistrate court, library, police quarters, and government clinic used to reside was redeveloped as the new Rawang town center.

Until the mid-2000s, the borders of Rawang has greatly expanded to encompass the rubber estates outside Serendah to the north (now the townships of Bukit Beruntung and Bukit Sentosa); and Sungai Bakau and parts of Kundang to the west (now the townships of Bandar Tasik Puteri, Bandar Country Homes, Emerald West, and Anggun Rawang). To sustain the growth in size and population, the PLUS North-South highway has now been complemented by the Guthrie Corridor Expressway (linking Rawang to Shah Alam), the LATAR highway (linking Rawang to Kuala Selangor) and  Rawang–Serendah bypass that replaces an earlier Outer Ring Road proposal.

Demographics and religion
Besides tin mines, Rawang also had large swathes of rubber estates at the outskirts of the town. Consequently, Rawang had a significant population of Chinese and Indian pioneers which, in combination with the existing Malay population, made Rawang a vibrant and diverse multi-racial town since the early-20th century. This is reflected in the presence of Malay, English, Tamil, and Chinese primary schools in close proximity to one another since the early days. The development in the 1980s and the clearing of plantations for housing brought about problems related to displaced workers and social problems of its own to Rawang and the issues related to gangsterism and crime.

The Sze Yeah Kong Temple (万挠师爷宫) was founded by the Hakka immigrants in 1869 as one of the primary Chinese temples in Rawang. Hakka and Hokkien immigrants dominated the tin mining sector in Rawang until the 1930s, during which Rawang continued growing at a rapid pace. There is also another old Chinese Temple known as Kam Yin Teng Temple (万挠感应亭), which was built in 1865.

The Indian community is made up mostly of the cement factory and plantation workers including small businesses that range from textile and silverware merchants to barbers and restaurants. The primary Hindu temple in Rawang, the Sri Veerakathy Vinayagar temple, was built along Jalan Welman in 1943. It is located less than 100 meters away from the Sze Yeah Kong Chinese temple.  
 
Rawang also has a Sikh community, originally opposite the Kampung Kenanga area is Kampung Benggali (Kampung Khalsa). The Rawang Sikh gurdwara (Gurdwara Sahib Rawang) was built in 1938 not far from the Rawang railway station now located at Rawang Tin.

Rawang is one of the few towns in Malaysia with a Gurkha population and a settlement. They are descendants of Gurkha military personnel who were brought in by the British.

The Malay community of Rawang primarily resides in two villages that border the town center who were mainly resettled into Kampung Kenanga in the late 1960s and Kampung Melayu in the 1980s. A mosque served the religious needs of the Malay community, located in Kampung Kenanga in 1969. Due to population growth, a new mosque was constructed at Kampung Melayu Batu 16. In 1971, the mosque was upgraded into a Masjid Jamek, and was officiated by the Sultan of Selangor on the 5th of March 1971 with the new name of Masjid Jamek Nurul Iman Rawang.

The St. Jude's Church located on the fringes of Rawang Town was built in 1955 and serves the Catholic community of Rawang.

Members of Parliament
1959-1964.       Liu Yoong Peng (Socialist Front)

1964-1969.       Tunku Abdullah Tuanku Abdul Rahman (Alliance, UMNO)

1969-1971.       Parliament Suspended 

1971-1974.       Tunku Abdullah Tuanku Abdul Rahman (BN, UMNO)

Constituency delineated, renamed to Selayang

1974-1975.       Walter Loh Poh Khan (BN, MCA)

1975-1978.       Rosemary Chow Poh Kheng (BN, MCA)

1978-1982.       Rafidah Aziz (BN, UMNO)

1982-1986.       Rahmah Othman (BN, UMNO)

1986-1995.       Zaleha Ismail (BN, UMNO)

1995-2008.       Chan Kong Choy (BN, MCA)

2008-Present.    William Leong Jee Keen (PH, PKR)

Representatives in the Selangor State Assembly
1974-1982.       Lee Kim Sai   (BN, MCA) 2 Terms

1982-2008.       Tang See Hang (BN, MCA) 6 Terms

2008-2018.       Gan Pei Nei   (PH, PKR) 2 Terms

2018-Present.    Chua Wei Kiat (PH, PKR) 1 Term

Location
To reach the town center, one must drive about 25 minutes from Kuala Lumpur. One can choose to take the Rawang Interchange 116 from the North–South Expressway, the Guthrie Corridor Expressway from Rawang South Interchange 115, the Kuala Lumpur–Kuala Selangor Expressway from Rawang South Interchange 115, the  road from Batang Berjuntai, or the trunk road to Rawang.

On the trunk road, passengers are able to see Templer Park, Hutan Lipur Sg. Kanching, and the Commonwealth Forest Park. These are all the remnants of the forest reserves that have been logged out or developed for more housing. The forest is a hot spot for jungle trekking and camping. The trees along the roads at Templer Park have been cleared for the construction of more houses and the slopes are left bare with much erosion. The trunk road from Templer Park to Bandar Baru Selayang is now widened to include the second lane. The Rawang Bypass highway, the highest in South East Asia cuts through the jungle and ends in Serendah to the north.

Education
Prior to the opening of the SRJK(Ing) Rawang in 1958, the private school, Clifford Institute used to be the only English school available for students pursuing an English Education. There are several primary and secondary schools in this town now. Some of the pioneer secondary schools such as Sekolah Menengah Seri Garing have a very large student population to the point that classes are even performed in shipping containers. Amateurish ad-hoc renovation and painting have marred the once elite and elegant school.

Primary schools
 Sekolah Rendah Sinaran Budi (formerly SRJK (Inggeris) Rawang. Est 1958
 Sekolah Jenis Kebangsaan (Cina) San Yuk 1
 Sekolah Jenis Kebangsaan (Cina) San Yuk 2 (Branch)
 Sekolah Rendah Agama Sungai Choh
 Sekolah Jenis Kebangsaan (Tamil) Rawang
 Sekolah Kebangsaan Bukit Rawang Jaya
 Sekolah Kebangsaan Bandar Baru Rawang
 Sekolah Kebangsaan Rawang
 Sekolah Kebangsaan Tun Teja
 Sekolah Jenis Kebangsaan (Cina) Kota Emerald
 Sekolah Kebangsaan Taman Desa
 Sekolah Kebangsaan Taman Desa 2
 Sekolah Kebangsaan Bandar Tasik Puteri
 Sekolah Kebangsaan Bandar Tasik Puteri 2
 Sekolah Kebangsaan Seri Kundang
 Sekolah Jenis Kebangsaan (Cina) Kundang
 Sekolah Rendah Agama Assiddiqin, Bandar Tasik Puteri
 KAFA Integrasi Al-Furqan, Bandar Country Homes
 KAFA Integrasi An-Nur, Bandar Country Homes
 Sekolah Rendah Agama Ibnu Khaldun, Batu 16, Rawang
 Sekolah Rendah Agama Al-Hidayah, Taman Tun Teja

Secondary schools 
 Oh My Training Academy (OMTA) 
 Sekolah Menengah Kebangsaan Seri Garing (formerly SMJK (Inggeris), Rawang
 Sekolah Menengah Kebangsaan Rawang Batu 16 (SEMEKAR)
 Sekolah Agama Menengah Rawang (SAMER)
 Sekolah Menengah Kebangsaan Tun Perak (SEMARAK)
 Sekolah Menengah Kebangsaan Taman Desa 1, Bandar Country Homes 
 Sekolah Menengah Kebangsaan Taman Desa 2, Bandar Country Homes (STAND 2)
 Sekolah Menengah Kebangsaan Bandar Tasik Puteri (SEMETRI)
 Sekolah Berasrama Penuh Integrasi Rawang, Bandar Tasik Puteri (SEPINTAR)
 Sekolah Menengah Kebangsaan Seri Kundang (SKUSES)

International School 
Straits International School
Knewton Global Schools
Templer Park International School

Neighbourhoods
Rawang is home to many housing areas old and new, such as Bandar Country Homes, Taman Anggun, Kota Emerald West, Kota Emerald East, Rawang Putra, Taman Bukit Rawang, Rawang Perdana, Taman Pelangi, Taman Tun Teja, Taman Jati and Taman Bersatu.

The first housing estates in Rawang were Rawang Garden, Green Park, New Green Park and Rawang Jaya to the north mostly developed by Lim Tan. Rawang Tin residents were resettled to Kuala Garing. There were also Taman Garing, Kuala Garing and Taman Sri Rawang to the west; Kampung Datuk Lee Kim Sai, Kampung Sungai Terentang, Kampung Kenanga and Kampung Melayu Batu 16 to the south.

Emerald (Emerald East and Emerald West), Hong Bee Anggun (Anggun 1, 2, and 3), Lake Club Parkhomes, and M Residences are new upscale gated-and-guarded neighborhoods that have emerged in recent years, with guardhouses and perimeter fencing for added security and privacy due to the high crime rate.

Development
Rawang is experiencing rapid development. Many new commercial and residential areas are being constructed. In 2006, a new central market was opened in Bandar Baru Rawang in order to meet the increasing demand from the population. There are a number of shopping centers in Rawang which include Lotus's, Parkson, and AEON. Despite the growth, the Police Department was downgraded from a district headquarters to an ordinary department that now has to handle the needs of a larger population. The road traffic in Rawang town is a perpetual problem with no remedy or supervision insight is almost always double or triple parked. The street lines are all faded with vehicles sometimes driving on the wrong way. There is no known road infrastructure or maintenance improvement from the opposition-led state government here. The road infrastructure continues to be stalled for years leading to Bandar Country Homes. Many of the busy roads in town and leading to the north-south highways constricts into a single lane from a 3 lane road contributing to daily traffic congestion. The town center appears unmanaged with a secondary jungle flourishing at the former Fire Station location and the Rawang railway station bypass. This could have been made into a recreational park instead.

Transport

Public Transport

The  Rawang train station, which is located in the middle of the old town area, was a major stop for KTM Intercity trains, notably Ekspres Peninsular until 2016. Now only the electric-powered KTM ETS trains serve the station. It is also served by the Tanjung Malim-Port Klang Route, commonly known as the  Port Klang Line on the KTM Komuter; before July 2016 passengers were required to alight at this station and change trains to continue their journey to Tanjung Malim. Prior to 2016, it was the terminus of the  Seremban Line before the route between Tanjung Malim/Rawang and Batu Caves were switched between the two lines.

A new and much bigger bus station located in the center of the new town area was completed recently. It's located opposite the Rawang Mydin Wholesaler. rapidKL buses provide limited services to Rawang; the major bus operator used to be Metrobus before being taken over by Setara Jaya Sdn Bhd (SJ Bus) in early 2016 under the Bus Network Revamp (BNR) initiative by SPAD.

Car
Federal Route 1 is the main thoroughfare going through Rawang town; motorists though prefer the more modern Expressway North–South Expressway Northern Route . GCE links Rawang to the state capital Shah Alam, while the LATAR is a shortcut to Kuala Selangor.

Religion

Temples
Mariamman temple Kg.Sungai Bakau

References

External links
Rawang Postcode

Gombak District
Towns in Selangor
Mukims of Selangor